Großer Brombachsee is a reservoir in the Franconian Lake District  in the south of central Franconia. It is fed and drained by the Brombach. Together with its two pre-dams, the Kleiner Brombachsee and the Igelsbachsee, it forms the region Brombachsee.

Inaugurated in 2000, the Brombachsee is the largest reservoir in the Franconian Lake District and the largest still water in Franconia. The lake is one of the largest dams in Germany, both in terms of surface area and storage volume. In addition to flood protection in the Altmühl valley, its main purpose is to regulate water levels in northern Bavaria, where rainfall is low. For this purpose, the lake can be filled across the continental divide from the Altmühl via the Altmühlsee up to the reservoir level of 410.5 metres. Via smaller tributaries, water can be released into the Regnitz, which flows into the Main, up to the drawdown limit of 403.5 m. In addition to water management purposes, the lake is also used for recreation, leisure and fishing.

References

Reservoirs in Bavaria
Weißenburg-Gunzenhausen